The Silent Stranger (Italian: Lo straniero di silenzio), also known as The Horseman and the Samurai and The Stranger in Japan, is a 1968 Spaghetti Western jidaigeki film directed by Luigi Vanzi. It is the second sequel to A Stranger in Town, with twenty minutes excised for its 1975 release. The film is the third in a series of four western films starring Tony Anthony as "The Stranger". Despite being produced in 1968 for MGM, the film was never given an official release until 1975, nearly a decade after the previous film in the series. Tony Anthony stated that he believed the film became the victim of a power struggle at MGM, and the film was re-edited when it was later released by a different studio.

Plot
The protagonist, a likeable American cowboy (Antony) in Edo-period 19th-Century Japan, becomes trapped in the middle of the strife between two feuding aristocratic Japanese families. The cowboy possesses a priceless scroll, acquired by chance while he was in Alaska, which both warring families want. Violent fighting ensues, involving Samuri swords, a Gatling gun, and a makeshift single-shot blunderbuss. In the end the cowboy returns the scroll (worth "one million dollars") to The Princess, a member of the family who are the rightful owners.

Cast
 Tony Anthony as The Stranger
 Lloyd Battista as The American
 Kin Ōmae as Lord Motori
 Kanji Ohara as Koeta
 Kita Maura as Princess Otaka
 Kyōichi Satō as Koeta's Henchman
 Yoshio Nukano as Motori Samurai
 Raf Baldassarre as White-Eye 
 Gaetano Scala as Thief in Klondike 
 William Conroy as Thief in Klondike

Reception

Paul Mavis, of DVDTalk, reviewing the 2015 Warner Archive Collection DVD release of The Stranger Collection, wrote, "While they're not in the league of Leone (what is?), Anthony's grimy, sneaky little punk killer is an intriguing addition to the genre. Tony Anthony did some very interesting things with the spaghetti Western genre, including, perhaps, presaging the Trinity movies, while certainly "inventing" the West-meets-East subgenre".

References

External links

1968 films
1960s Italian-language films
English-language Italian films
Spaghetti Western films
1968 Western (genre) films
Metro-Goldwyn-Mayer films
United Artists films
Films set in Japan
Films scored by Stelvio Cipriani
Japan in non-Japanese culture
1960s Italian films